"The Meaning of Love" is a song by Depeche Mode.

The Meaning of Love may also refer to:

The Meaning of Love (album), by Michelle McManus
"The Meaning of Love" (Michelle McManus song)
"The Meaning of Love", a song by Joe Satriani from the album Super Colossal